The men's 440 yards event at the 1950 British Empire Games was held on 9 and 11 February at the Eden Park in Auckland, New Zealand.

Medalists

Results

Heats
Held on 9 February

Qualification: First 3 in each heat (Q) qualify directly for the semifinals.

Semifinals
Held on 9 February

Qualification: First 3 in each heat (Q) qualify directly for the final.

Final
Held on 11 February

References

Athletics at the 1950 British Empire Games
1950